Possil railway station was situated on Balmore Road, in the north of Glasgow, Scotland and served the Possilpark and Parkhouse areas of the city.

History
Part of the Lanarkshire and Dunbartonshire Railway, it served as the terminus for passenger services, but allowed for through services for the transport of freight. Services ran from Rutherglen to Possil, via Glasgow Central Railway.

There was a goods yard at the site of the station, which was closed as part of the Beeching Axe. A scrapyard now occupies the site, although the station building and goods shed are still standing. The building has a slightly similar design to the now extinct Botanic Gardens structure on the Glasgow Central Railway. It has the company monogram "CR" carved in the stone above the two windows on the building's left frontal facade. It was in use as a bookmakers for many years in the 80s and 90s but by 2006, it was empty and falling into disrepair. It is now protected as a category C(S) listed building.

Gallery

See also
Possilpark and Parkhouse railway station

References

Notes

Sources

Disused railway stations in Glasgow
Beeching closures in Scotland
Railway stations in Great Britain opened in 1897
Railway stations in Great Britain closed in 1908
Railway stations in Great Britain opened in 1934
Railway stations in Great Britain closed in 1964
Former Caledonian Railway stations
Category C listed buildings in Glasgow
Listed railway stations in Scotland